Events in the year 2018 in Samoa.

Incumbents
O le Ao o le Malo: Va'aletoa Sualauvi II
Prime Minister: Tuilaepa Aiono Sailele Malielegaoi

Events

8 to 9 February – Samoa was struck by the Cyclone Gita, and a state of disaster was declared for the nation on 10 February.

Deaths
2 April – Tuiloma Pule Lameko, politician (b. 1934).

References

 
2010s in Samoa
Years of the 21st century in Samoa
Samoa
Samoa